New Italy may refer to:
New Italy, an Italian foundation chaired by Gianni Alemanno
New Italy, New South Wales, a locality in Australia